Eagle Cap Wilderness is a wilderness area located in the Wallowa Mountains of northeastern Oregon (United States), within the Wallowa–Whitman National Forest. The wilderness was established in 1940. In 1964, it was included in the National Wilderness Preservation System.

Eagle Cap Wilderness is named after a peak in the Wallowa Mountains, which were once called the Eagle Mountains.  At  Eagle Cap was incorrectly thought to be the highest peak in the range.

Topography
The Eagle Cap Wilderness is characterized by high alpine lakes and meadows, bare granite peaks and ridges, and U-shaped glacial valleys. Thick timber is found in the lower valleys and scattered alpine timber on the upper slopes.

History
The Eagle Cap Wilderness and surrounding country in the Wallowa–Whitman National Forest was first occupied by the ancestors of the Nez Perce Indian tribe around 1400 AD, and later by the Cayuse, the Shoshone, and Bannocks.  The wilderness was used as hunting grounds for bighorn sheep and deer and to gather huckleberries.  It was the summer home to the Joseph Band of the Nez Perce tribe.  1860 marked the year the first settlers moved into the Wallowa Valley.  In 1930, the Eagle Cap was established as a primitive area and in 1940 earned wilderness designation.

Wildlife
Eagle Cap Wilderness is home to a variety of wildlife, including black bears, cougars, Rocky Mountain bighorn sheep, and mountain goats. In the summer white-tailed deer, mule deer, and Rocky Mountain elk roam the wilderness. Smaller mammals that inhabit the area year-round include the pika, pine martens, badgers, squirrels, and marmots. Birds include peregrine falcons, bald eagles, golden eagles, ferruginous hawks, and gray-crowned rosy finch.  Trout can be found in many of the lakes and streams in the wilderness.
The Oregon State record golden trout was caught in the wilderness in 1987, by Douglas White. The lake where it was caught was not named.

Moose have recently returned to the wilderness; the herd now numbers about 40. There is possible evidence that grizzly bears and wolverines are returning as well. Sheep and cattle graze throughout Eagle Cap Wilderness, especially the surroundings of Mount Nebo. Shortly after World War II with the impact of the wool industry, the number of sheep nearly disappeared in the Eagle Cap Wilderness, while at the beginning of the 1900, their numbers exceeded the carrying capacity of the wilderness.

Wolves
Wolves have returned to Eagle Cap Wilderness with no reported encounters with humans, although some losses of sheep and cattle have been attributed to wolves in the area. In 2012, a trail-cam recorded a female black wolf. Tracking of the wolf revealed at least three total wolves in an area east of Minam River. Further surveys by the end of 2012 showed a count of at least seven wolves in a pack within the Upper Minam River area. The Oregon Department of Fish and Wildlife reported in 2013 a total of six known packs with 46 total wolves. All animals belonged to the same pack and are designated Minam Pack. 

The first grey wolf trapped and radio-collared tagged by the ODFW was an  female individual and marks the twentieth radio-collared wolf in Oregon. Another female was radio-collared which dispersed from the Miniam Pack and found traveling with another male wolf within the Miniam Area and into the Keating Unit. Through 2019 the Minam Pack produced litters annually within the Eagle Cap Wilderness. One of the females from the Minam Pack formed a pair bond in 2014 with a male member of the Snake River Pack forming a new pack within the Eagle Cap Wilderness, designated the Catherine Pack. The adult female was found deceased in 2019 although the pack remained classified as a breeding pack through 2019.

Vegetation

Plant communities in the Eagle Cap Wilderness range from low elevation grasslands and ponderosa pine forest to alpine meadows.  Engelmann spruce, larch, mountain hemlock, sub-alpine fir, and whitebark pine can be found in the higher elevations.  Varieties of Indian paintbrush, sego lilies, elephanthead, larkspur, shooting star, and bluebells are abundant in the meadows.  The wilderness does contain some small groves of old growth forest.

Recreation
As Oregon's largest wilderness area, Eagle Cap offers many recreational activities, including hiking, backpacking, horseback riding, hunting, fishing, camping, and wildlife watching. Winter brings backcountry skiing and snowshoeing opportunities. Several Alpine Huts and campsites are located throughout the McCully Basin, which are used as a base camp in the winter for telemark skiing.

Wild and Scenic Rivers
Four designated Wild and Scenic Rivers originate in Eagle Cap Wilderness—the Lostine, Eagle Creek, Minam, and Imnaha.

Lostine River

 of the Lostine from its headwaters in the wilderness to the Wallowa–Whitman National Forest boundary are designated Wild and Scenic. A small portion of the river is on private property.

Eagle Creek
 of Eagle Creek from its output at Eagle Lake in the wilderness to the Wallowa–Whitman National Forest boundary at Skull Creek are designated Wild and Scenic.

Minam
 of the Minam River from its headwaters at the south end of Minam Lake to the wilderness boundary, one-half mile downstream from Cougar Creek, are designated Wild and Scenic.  In 1988, all  were designated "wild."

Imnaha
 of the Imnaha River from its headwaters are designated Wild and Scenic. The designation comprises the main stem from the confluence of the North and South Forks of the Imnaha River to its mouth, and the South Fork from its headwaters to the confluence with the main stem.

Lakes

See also 
 List of Oregon Wildernesses
 List of U.S. Wilderness Areas
 List of old growth forests

References

External links
 Eagle Cap Wilderness - Wallowa–Whitman National Forest
 Eagle Cap Wilderness - Wilderness.net
 EagleCapWilderness.com
 Eagle Cap Wilderness - JosephOregon.com

 
Protected areas of Baker County, Oregon
IUCN Category Ib
Protected areas of Union County, Oregon
Protected areas of Wallowa County, Oregon
Wilderness areas of Oregon
Old-growth forests
1940 establishments in Oregon